The Natural Soul is an album by jazz saxophonist Lou Donaldson recorded for the Blue Note label in 1962 and performed by Donaldson with Grant Green, Tommy Turrentine, Big John Patton, and Ben Dixon.

Reception
The album was awarded 4 stars in an Allmusic review by Stephen Thomas Erlewine who states "The Natural Soul finds Lou Donaldson delving deeply into soul-jazz, recording a set of funky, greasy instrumentals with only a few references to hard bop... The original compositions — which form the bulk of the album — aren't much more than blues and soul vamps, but they provide an excellent foundation for the combo to work hot grooves. And, in the end, that's what The Natural Soul is about — groove. It maintains the high standards Donaldson established with his first soul-jazz foray, Here 'Tis, and remains one of his best records in that genre".

Track listing 
All compositions by Lou Donaldson except where noted

 "Funky Mama" (Big John Patton) - 9:08
 "Love Walked In" (Gershwin, Gershwin) - 5:12
 "Spaceman Twist" - 5:38
 "Sow Belly Blues" - 10:13
 "That's All" (Alan Brandt, Bob Haymes) - 5:36
 "Nice 'n' Greasy" (John Adriano Acea) - 5:27
 "People Will Say We're in Love" (Hammerstein II, Rodgers) - 7:53 Bonus track on CD

Personnel 
 Lou Donaldson - alto saxophone
 Tommy Turrentine - trumpet
 Grant Green - guitar
 Big John Patton - organ
 Ben Dixon - drums

References 

Lou Donaldson albums
1963 albums
Albums produced by Alfred Lion
Blue Note Records albums
Albums recorded at Van Gelder Studio